The ITTF World Youth Championships is an annual table tennis competition for juniors under 19 and under 15. From 2003 to 2019, the World Junior Table Tennis Championships was held for juniors under 18. The ITTF changed the U18 age group into U19 in 2020, and implemented the new World Youth Championships for U19 and U15 in 2021. The World Youth Championships is currently composed of two team events and five individual events in each of the U19 and U15 age groups.

Editions

 2020 World Junior Table Tennis Championships was cancelled due to the COVID-19 pandemic.

Medals

World Junior Table Tennis Championships (2003–2019)

 2003, 2004 and 2005 have not share bronze medals in team events.

ITTF World Youth Championships (2021–2022)

See also
Table tennis at the Youth Olympic Games
World Table Tennis Championships
World Para Table Tennis Championships

References

External links
World Youth Championships
ITTF Results Ranking and Statistics

 
table tennis
Table tennis competitions
Recurring sporting events established in 2003
Annual sporting events